Municipal Mutual Insurance (MMI) is an insurance company registered in the United Kingdom. It was established by local authorities, and was formally incorporated on 13 March 1903.

Over the following decades it became responsible for insuring most public sector bodies, including councils, police and fire authorities.  Between 1990 and 1992, the company suffered substantial losses, and its assets were reduced to below the minimum level for solvency.  In 1993, it was bought by Zurich Insurance, although MMI itself continues to pay all its outstanding liabilities.

References

External links
 MMI Annual Report and Accounts for the year ended 30 June 2012
Report states Municipal Mutual Insurance sought to restrict child sex abuse inquiry

Financial services companies established in 1903
Insurance companies of the United Kingdom
Zurich Insurance Group